Odvar Nordli (3 November 1927 – 9 January 2018) was a Norwegian politician from the Labour Party. He was the 28th prime minister of Norway from 1976 to 1981 during the Cold War.
Before serving as Prime Minister, Nordli served as the minister of Local Government from 1971 to 1972.

After serving as prime minister, Nordli served as the vice president of the Storting from 1981 until 1985, and was also a member of the Norwegian Nobel Committee from 1985 until 1996.

Early life 
A son of railroad worker Eugen Nordli (1905–1991) and housewife Marie (1905–1984), born Jørgensen, Nordli grew up in Tangen in Stange, Hedmark. After World War II he served in the Independent Norwegian Brigade Group in Germany, part of the Allied forces occupying post-war Germany.

By education he became a certified accountant before entering politics, and worked in this field until 1961. He served as deputy mayor of Stange municipality from 1951 to 1963.

Early political career 
He was elected to the Norwegian Parliament from Hedmark in 1961, and was re-elected on five occasions. He had previously served in the position of deputy representative during the terms 1954–1957 and 1958–1961.

Nordli became a cabinet member in 1971, serving as Minister of Local Government in the first cabinet Bratteli.

At the Labour Party Congress in 1975 both Nordli and Reiulf Steen candidated to replace Trygve Bratteli as new leader. A compromise was worked out that made Steen the new party leader while Nordli was designated as the party's new prime minister. This became a strained arrangement and they never cooperated well.

Prime Minister of Norway

Nordli became Prime Minister in 1976, heading the cabinet Nordli which succeeded the second cabinet Bratteli. He had to govern through several tough cases like the so-called double-resolution over NATO and the national controversy over the damming of the Alta-Kautokeino river.

In social policy, Nordli's premiership in 1978 saw improved sickness benefits to 100% wage compensation from day one of sickness for up to 52 weeks. The previous law had not had any compensation for ordinary workers for the first 3 days and 90% compensation after that time. The same year the Abortion Act of 1975 was liberalized and women were granted the right to decide on their own to have an abortion until the end of week 12 after gestation. In the original act approval of a committee of doctors had been required in order to have an abortion.

The Nordli cabinet under Minister of Finance Per Kleppe continued a Keynesian fiscal policy with deficit spending where Norway loaned abroad against future oil income. Wages increased more than in other countries, leading to Norwegian businesses becoming less competitive. In September 1978 the government through a provisional law made a general ban against increases in wages and prices. The law was in effect through 1979. The cabinet also partly reversed the expansive fiscal policy.

As for foreign relations during the Nordli premiership, Norway established a 200 nautical miles exclusive economic zone in 1977 where Norway claimed exclusive rights to marine resources. This caused complications with Russia that also had a 200 nm fishery zone. In 1978, Norway, led by maritime law minister Jens Evensen, and Russia agreed on a one year Grey Zone Agreement which was subsequently renewed until it was replaced with a permanent agreement in 2010.

The 1977 Norwegian parliamentary election less than a year into Nordli's premiership was a success for Nordli and the Labour Party which continued in position, but the 1979 Norwegian local elections was a set-back, partly due to the economic situation and it weakened Nordli's position.

Nordli got health problems about two years into his premiership and in 1981 his doctor advised him to take a sick leave. This leaked to the media before Nordli had made any decision and as a result he was soon after replaced by Gro Harlem Brundtland and another Labour cabinet, Brundtland's First Cabinet.

Post-Prime Minister career

After retiring as prime minister in 1981, he was elected vice president of the Storting. He served as vice president until 1985.

His career ended with the post of County Governor of Hedmark, which he held from 1981 until his retirement in 1993. He was also a member of the Norwegian Nobel Committee from 1985 to 1993.

After retiring, Nordli had a number of books published which included autobiographical writings and lighter stories about politics, daily life and nature.

Personal life 
Nordli met his wife Marit Haraseth (born 28 April 1931) in Hedmark Labour Youth. They married in 1953, had two daughters and lived in Stange.

Nordli died on 9 January 2018 of prostate cancer in Oslo at the age of 90. His state funeral was held on 19 January 2018.

Awards
Commander of the Order of St. Olav (1994)

Selected works
Langs veg og sti, Gyldendal, 1984
Min vei, Tiden, 1985
Morgenlandet, Damm, 1991
Vi så kornmoglansen, Tiden, 1994
Storting og småting, Tiden, 1996
Skråblikk fra godstolen, Trysil-forlaget, 2006
With Kåre Willoch: Alvorlig talt: samtaler om politikk, Aschehoug, 2008

See also
Trygve Bratteli
Gro Harlem Brundtland

References

External links

Documentary featuring Nordli

1927 births
2018 deaths
People from Stange
Deaths from prostate cancer
Labour Party (Norway) politicians
Members of the Storting
Ministers of Local Government and Modernisation of Norway
Prime Ministers of Norway
Vice Presidents of the Storting
20th-century Norwegian politicians
Norwegian political writers
Norwegian nature writers
Norwegian essayists
Norwegian male writers